A positive covenant is a kind of agreement relating to land, where the covenant requires positive expenditure by the person bound, in order to fulfil its terms.

See also 
English land law
Equitable servitude
Easement
Restrictive covenant
Halsall v Brizell, 1957

Notes and sources

Property law